John Chapman was an English amateur footballer who played as a centre forward in the Football League for Clapton Orient. He was a first reserve for an England Amateurs match versus Ireland in November 1913, but failed to win a cap.

Personal life 
Chapman served in the Postal Section of the Royal Engineers during the First World War.

Career statistics

References

English footballers
Brentford F.C. players
English Football League players
Association football forwards
Southern Football League players
Southall F.C. players
Footballers from Islington (district)
1895 births
Leyton Orient F.C. players
Year of death missing
British Army personnel of World War I
Royal Engineers soldiers
Clapton Orient F.C. wartime guest players